The following elections occurred in the year 2000.

Africa
 2000 Ethiopian general election
 2000 Ghanaian presidential election
 1999–2000 Guinea-Bissau general election
 2000–01 Ivorian parliamentary election
 2000 Ivorian presidential election
 2000 Mauritian general election
 2000 Ghanaian parliamentary election
 2000 Senegalese presidential election
 2000 South African municipal elections
 2000 Sudanese general election
 2000 Tanzanian general election
 2000 Zimbabwean constitutional referendum
 2000 Zimbabwean parliamentary election

Asia
 2000–2001 Azerbaijani parliamentary election
 2000 Hong Kong legislative election
 2000 Iranian legislative election
 2000 Japanese general election
 2000 Kyrgyz presidential election
 2000 Mongolian legislative election
 2000 Republic of China presidential election (Taiwan)
 2000 South Korean legislative election
 2000 Sri Lankan parliamentary election
 2000 Uzbek presidential election

India
 2000 Bihar Legislative Assembly election

Japan
 2000 Japanese general election

Russia
 Elections in Astrakhan Oblast
 Krasnodar Krai Head of Administration elections
 2000 Russian presidential election

Turkey
 2000 Turkish presidential election

Australia
 2000 Benalla state by-election
 2000 Bundamba state by-election
 2000 Isaacs by-election
 2000 Woodridge state by-election

Europe
 2000 Belarusian parliamentary election
 2000 Belgian local elections
 2000 Croatian parliamentary election
 2000 Croatian presidential election
 2000 Yugoslavian presidential election
 2000 Finnish presidential election
 2000 Gibraltar general election
 2000 Greek legislative election
 2000 Lithuanian parliamentary election
 2000 Montenegrin municipal elections
 2000 Northern Cyprus presidential election
 2000 Polish presidential election
 2000 Portuguese regional elections
 2000 Romanian presidential election
 2000 Romanian legislative election
 2000 Serbian parliamentary election
 2000 Slovenian parliamentary election
 2000 Ukrainian constitutional referendum

Austria
 2000 Burgenland state election

France
 2000 French constitutional referendum

Germany
 2000 North Rhine-Westphalia state election
 2000 Schleswig-Holstein state election

Italy
 2000 Abruzzo regional election
 2000 Apulian regional election
 2000 Basilicata regional election
 2000 Calabrian regional election
 2000 Campania regional election
 2000 Emilia-Romagna regional election
 2000 Lazio regional election
 2000 Ligurian regional election
 2000 Lombard regional election
 2000 Marche regional election
 2000 Molise regional election
 2000 Piedmontese regional election
 2000 Tuscan regional election
 2000 Umbrian regional election
 2000 Venetian regional election

Moldova
 2000 Transnistrian legislative election

Russia
 Elections in Astrakhan Oblast
 Krasnodar Krai Head of Administration elections
 2000 Russian presidential election

Spain
 2000 Spanish general election

Turkey
 2000 Turkish presidential election

United Kingdom
 2000 Ayr by-election
 2000 Ceredigion by-election
 2000 Falkirk West by-election
 2000 Glasgow Anniesland by-elections
 2000 London Assembly election
 2000 Preston by-election
 2000 Romsey by-election
 2000 South Antrim by-election
 2000 Speaker of the British House of Commons election
 2000 Tottenham by-election
 2000 Ulster Unionist Party leadership election

United Kingdom local
 2000 United Kingdom local elections
 2000 London mayoral election

English local
 2000 Adur Council election
 2000 Amber Valley Council election
 2000 Barrow-in-Furness Council election
 2000 Blackpool Council election
 2000 Bolton Council election
 2000 Brentwood Council election
 2000 Burnley Council election
 2000 Bury Council election
 2000 Calderdale Council election
 2000 Cheltenham Council election
 2000 Cherwell Council election
 2000 Chorley Council election
 2000 Craven Council election
 2000 Daventry Council election
 2000 Derby Council election
 2000 Eastleigh Council election
 2000 Ellesmere Port and Neston Council election
 2000 Epping Forest Council election
 2000 Fareham Council election
 2000 Gateshead Council election
 2000 Gosport Council election
 2000 Halton Council election
 2000 Harlow Council election
 2000 Hart Council election
 2000 Hartlepool Council election
 2000 Hastings Council election
 2000 Hull Council election
 2000 Hyndburn Council election
 2000 Ipswich Borough Council election
 2000 Knowsley Council election
 2000 Leeds City Council election
 2000 City of Lincoln Council election
 2000 Liverpool City Council election
 2000 Manchester City Council election
 2000 Mole Valley Council election
 2000 Newcastle-under-Lyme Council election
 2000 Oldham Council election
 2000 Oxford City Council election
 2000 Penwith Council election
 2000 Portsmouth Council election
 2000 Purbeck Council election
 2000 Redditch Council election
 2000 Rochdale Council election
 2000 Rochford Council election
 2000 Rossendale Council election
 2000 Rugby Council election
 2000 Runnymede Council election
 2000 Rushmoor Council election
 2000 Salford Council election
 2000 Sefton Council election
 2000 Solihull Council election
 2000 South Lakeland Council election
 2000 South Tyneside Council election
 2000 Southampton City Council election
 2000 Southend-on-Sea Council election
 2000 St Albans Council election
 2000 St Helens Council election
 2000 Stevenage Council election
 2000 Stratford-on-Avon Council election
 2000 Swindon Council election
 2000 Tamworth Council election
 2000 Tandridge Council election
 2000 Three Rivers Council election
 2000 Thurrock Council election
 2000 Torbay Council election
 2000 Trafford Council election
 2000 Tunbridge Wells Council election
 2000 Wakefield Council election
 2000 Watford Council election
 2000 Waveney Council election
 2000 Welwyn Hatfield Council election
 2000 West Lancashire Council election
 2000 West Lindsey Council election
 2000 Weymouth and Portland Council election
 2000 Wigan Council election
 2000 Winchester Council election
 2000 Windsor and Maidenhead Council election
 2000 Wirral Council election
 2000 Woking Council election
 2000 Wokingham Council election
 2000 Wolverhampton Council election
 2000 Worcester Council election
 2000 Worthing Council election
 2000 Wyre Forest Council election

Japan
 2000 Japanese general election

Mexico
 2000 Mexican general election

North America
 1999–2000 Belizean municipal elections
 2000 Mexican general election
 2000 Salvadoran legislative election

Canada
 2000 Prince Edward Island general election
 2000 Yukon general election

Canadian federal
 2000 Canadian federal election
 Results of the 2000 Canadian federal election

Ontario municipal
 2000 Brantford municipal election
 2000 Greater Sudbury municipal election
 2000 Guelph municipal election
 2000 Hamilton, Ontario municipal election
 2000 Norfolk County municipal election
 2000 Ottawa municipal election
 2000 Peterborough municipal election
 2000 St. Catharines municipal election
 2000 Toronto municipal election
 2000 Vaughan municipal election
 2000 Windsor municipal election

Caribbean
 2000 Dominican Republic presidential election
 2000 Dominican general election
 2000 Haitian parliamentary election
 2000 Haitian presidential election
 2000 Saint Pierre and Miquelon legislative election
 2000 Trinidad and Tobago general election

Puerto Rican
 2000 Puerto Rican general election

Mexico
 Mexican general election

Peru 
 Peruvian general election

Puerto Rican
 2000 Puerto Rican general election

United States
 2000 United States House of Representatives elections
 2000 United States Senate elections
 2000 United States gubernatorial elections
 2000 United States elections
 2000 United States presidential election

United States gubernatorial
 2000 Delaware gubernatorial election
 2000 New Hampshire gubernatorial election
 2000 North Carolina gubernatorial election
 2000 North Dakota gubernatorial election
 2000 United States gubernatorial elections
 2000 Vermont gubernatorial election
 2000 Washington gubernatorial election

Alabama
 2000 United States presidential election in Alabama

Arizona
 English for Children (Arizona Proposition 203, 2000)
 2000 United States Senate election in Arizona

Arkansas
 2000 United States presidential election in Arkansas

California
 2000 California State Assembly election
 2000 California Democratic presidential primary
 2000 California elections
 2000 California Republican presidential primary
 2000 San Francisco Board of Supervisors election
 2000 California State Senate election
 2000 United States House of Representatives elections in California
 2000 United States Senate election in California

Colorado
 2000 United States presidential election in Colorado

Delaware
 2000 Delaware gubernatorial election

Florida
 2000 United States Senate election in Florida

Georgia (U.S. state)
 2000 United States House of Representatives elections in Georgia

Hawaii
 2000 United States Senate election in Hawaii
 2000 United States presidential election in Hawaii

Idaho
 2000 United States presidential election in Idaho

Illinois
 2000 Illinois's 1st congressional district election
 2000 United States presidential election in Illinois

Iowa
 2000 Iowa Democratic caucuses
 2000 Iowa Republican caucuses
 2000 United States presidential election in Iowa

Maine
 2000 United States presidential election in Maine
 2000 United States Senate election in Maine

Maryland
 2000 United States Senate election in Maryland
 2000 United States presidential election in Maryland

Massachusetts
 2000 United States presidential election in Massachusetts
 2000 United States Senate election in Massachusetts

Michigan
 2000 United States Senate election in Michigan
 2000 United States presidential election in Michigan

Missouri
 2000 Missouri Democratic presidential primary
 2000 Missouri Republican presidential primary
 2000 United States Senate election in Missouri
 2000 United States presidential election in Missouri

Montana
 2000 United States Senate election in Montana

New Hampshire
 2000 New Hampshire gubernatorial election

New Mexico
 2000 United States Senate election in New Mexico
 2000 United States presidential election in New Mexico

North Carolina
 2000 North Carolina Council of State election
 2000 North Carolina judicial elections
 2000 North Carolina lieutenant gubernatorial election
 2000 North Carolina gubernatorial election
 2000 United States House of Representatives elections in North Carolina

North Dakota
 2000 North Dakota gubernatorial election
 2000 United States House of Representatives election in North Dakota
 2000 United States Senate election in North Dakota

Oregon
 Oregon Ballot Measure 7 (2000)
 2000 United States presidential election in Oregon

Pennsylvania
 2000 Pennsylvania Attorney General election
 2000 Pennsylvania Auditor General election
 2000 Pennsylvania House of Representatives election
 2000 Pennsylvania Senate election
 2000 Pennsylvania state elections
 2000 Pennsylvania State Treasurer election
 2000 United States House of Representatives elections in Pennsylvania

Puerto Rican
 2000 Puerto Rican general election

South Carolina
 2000 South Carolina Republican presidential primary
 2000 United States House of Representatives elections in South Carolina

Tennessee
 2000 United States Senate election in Tennessee

United States House of Representatives
 2000 United States House of Representatives elections
 2000 United States House of Representatives elections in California
 2000 United States House of Representatives elections in Georgia
 2000 Illinois's 1st congressional district election
 2000 United States House of Representatives election in North Dakota
 2000 United States House of Representatives elections in South Carolina

United States Senate
 2000 United States Senate elections
 2000 United States Senate election in California
 2000 United States Senate election in Connecticut
 2000 United States Senate election in Georgia
 2000 United States Senate election in Hawaii
 2000 United States Senate election in Indiana
 2000 United States Senate election in Maine
 2000 United States Senate election in Massachusetts
 2000 United States Senate election in Minnesota
 2000 United States Senate election in Missouri
 2000 United States Senate election in Montana
 2000 United States Senate election in Nebraska
 2000 United States Senate election in Nevada
 2000 United States Senate election in New Mexico
 2000 United States Senate election in New York
 2000 United States Senate election in North Dakota
 2000 United States Senate election in Ohio
 2000 United States Senate election in Rhode Island
 2000 United States Senate election in Tennessee
 2000 United States Senate election in Texas
 2000 United States Senate election in Arizona
 2000 United States Senate election in Delaware
 2000 United States Senate election in Florida
 2000 United States Senate election in Maryland
 2000 United States Senate election in Michigan
 2000 United States Senate election in Mississippi
 2000 United States Senate election in New Jersey
 2000 United States Senate election in Utah
 2000 United States Senate election in Vermont
 2000 United States Senate election in Virginia
 2000 United States Senate election in Washington
 2000 United States Senate election in West Virginia
 2000 United States Senate election in Wisconsin
 2000 United States Senate election in Wyoming

Utah
 2000 United States Senate election in Utah
 2000 United States presidential election in Utah

Vermont
 2000 United States presidential election in Vermont
 2000 Vermont gubernatorial election

Virginia
 2000 United States Senate election in Virginia
 2000 United States presidential election in Virginia

Washington (U.S. state)
 2000 United States presidential election in Washington (state)
 2000 United States Senate election in Washington
 2000 Washington attorney general election
 2000 Washington gubernatorial election

Washington, D.C.
 2000 United States presidential election in the District of Columbia

West Virginia
 2000 United States Senate election in West Virginia
 2000 United States presidential election in West Virginia

Wisconsin
 2000 United States Senate election in Wisconsin

Wyoming
 2000 United States Senate election in Wyoming

Oceania

Australia
 2000 Benalla state by-election
 2000 Bundamba state by-election
 2000 Isaacs by-election
 2000 Woodridge state by-election

Hawaii
 United States Senate election in Hawaii, 2000
 United States presidential election in Hawaii, 2000

South America
 1999–2000 Chilean presidential election
 2000 Uruguayan municipal elections
 2000 Venezuelan parliamentary election
 2000 Venezuelan presidential election

See also

 
2000
Elections